Weston is an unincorporated community and census-designated place (CDP) located in Franklin Township, in Somerset County, New Jersey, United States. As of the 2010 United States Census, the CDP's population was 1,235.

Situated on the east side of the Millstone River north of East Millstone and south of Zarephath (which has grown to include some of the area once considered Weston), early names used for the area were Schenck's Mill, Van Neste's Mill and Frogtown.  Historically, an area on the west side of the river in what is now part of the borough of Manville was also referred to as Weston.  The Weston Causeway is the only bridge across the Millstone River between East Millstone and the confluence with the Raritan River near South Bound Brook.

History
Heinrich/Henry Schenck built a grist mill on the east bank of the Millstone here, probably in the 1740s.  His brother, Peter, built a mill upstream at Blackwells Mills  about the same time and both were called Schenck's Mill.   Three of Henry's sons, Abraham, John and Henry were in the second graduating class of 14 students of the newly founded Queen's College that later became Rutgers University. His daughter, Gertrude Schenck, married Fredrick Frelinghuysen, son of the Dutch-reformed minister and tutor to the boys at Queen's College. Frelinghuysen would attend the Continental Congress, rise to rank of Major General, and become a US Senator and US District Attorney.  Fredrick and Gertrude would start the #6 ranked political dynasty in American history. In 2018, U.S. Representative from New Jersey, Rodney Frelinghuysen retired, ending the dynasty.

The second owner of the mill was Abraham Van Neste, from 1771-1797. During his tenure, on January 21, 1777, there was a skirmish at the mill, known as the Battle of Millstone or the Battle of Van Nest's Mill,  between a British foraging party of about 600 troops, sent out of New Brunswick by General Cornwallis, seeking the large quantity of flour they believed was stored there and a party of about 450 militia including Frelinghuysen and the Schencks, commanded by General Philemon Dickinson.  With the bridge at Weston guarded by the British, the American force had to wade across the waist deep, ice-filled river.  Nevertheless, they so surprised the foraging party the British retreated without ever firing a single one of their three field pieces.  In their haste, the British left behind 43 wagons, 164 horses, 118 cattle, 70 sheep and 12 soldiers who became prisoners.  In the skirmish, 5 Americans were lost but the British lost about 30 men.

When William Rodgers owned the mill between 1823 and 1843, he changed the name to Weston, purportedly to reflect the name used at the time for an area across the river from the mill.

The Delaware and Raritan Canal was completed through Weston in 1834 and a Bridgetender's House, now unused, is located on the southeast side of the bridge.  The Canal Company maintained one of its six telegraph stations in Weston.  Used to send express messages regarding damage to locks and bridges, breaks in or poor conditions of the canal banks, unusual water levels, boat accidents and speeders to other stations and the company office, the Canal Company is believed to have been one of the first users of the Morse telegraph in the United States.  Unlike other communities located near the canal, Weston does not seem to have received any significant benefits from its construction.

By the 1880s Weston included a post office, schoolhouse, blacksmith shop, store, gristmill, sawmill, and about 15 dwellings.

Wilbur Smith was the last owner of the original mill from 1925 until 1982 when it fell into the river.  He had worked for many years in an attempt to save the old mill but, after it collapsed, it was determined that it was beyond repair and now considered a flood hazard.  There were plans to salvage parts of the historic structure but before the group, the Meadows Foundation, had a chance to do much work, vandals set the mill on fire, destroying what was left of it.

With the mill gone, all that remains in the area once known as Weston are a few residences and several roads bearing the name.

Geography
According to the United States Census Bureau, Weston had a total area of 1.447 square miles (3.748 km2), including 1.395 square miles (3.614 km2) of land and 0.052 square miles (0.134 km2) of water (3.58%).

Demographics

Census 2010

See also
Battle of Millstone
Manville, New Jersey
Van Nest – Weston Burying Ground
Zarephath, New Jersey

References

External links
The Battle of Millstone / Van Nest's Mills

Census-designated places in Somerset County, New Jersey
Franklin Township, Somerset County, New Jersey